Chisholm is a Scottish surname. Variants include Chisholme and Chisolm.

The original name was 'De Chesé' to which the Saxon termination 'holme' was added on the marriage of a Norman ancestor with a Saxon heiress. The first recorded person of the name is a John de Chisholme, who is named in 1254 in a bull of Pope Alexander IV and found in the County of Roxburgh  In the 14th century, members of the Chisholm family migrated into the Scottish Highlands and their name was Gaelicised. The Scottish Gaelic form of the name is Siosal (masculine), and Shiosal (feminine).

Notable people with the surname or its variants include:

Chisholm

In Australia
 Alan Rowland Chisholm (1888–1981), professor of French, critic and memorialist
 Alexander Hugh Chisholm (1890–1977), journalist, newspaper editor, author and ornithologist
 Alice Chisholm (1856–1954), Australian woman who provided canteen services for soldiers in Egypt and Palestine during World War I
 Anthony Chisholm (politician) (born 1978), Australian politician
 Caroline Chisholm (1808–1877) Renowned 19th century social worker in Australia
 Dane Chisholm (born 1990), Australian rugby league footballer
 Eric Chisholm (1892–1946), Australian rules footballer
 Geoff Chisholm (1929–2006), Australian politician
 Keith Chisholm (1918–1991), distinguished Australian fighter pilot
 Les Chisholm (1888–1923), Australian rules footballer
 Mark Chisholm (born 1981), Australian rugby union footballer
 Scott Chisholm (footballer) (born 1973), Aboriginal Australian Rules footballer
 Sheila Chisholm (1895–1969), socialite in British high society

In Canada
 Alexander Chisholm (Upper Canada politician) (1790–1854), political figure in Upper Canada
 Angus Chisholm (1908–1979), Cape Breton fiddler
 Arthur Murray Chisholm (1871–1960), Canadian author of Western fiction
 Bob Chisholm (born 1947), Canadian politician
 Brock Chisholm (1896–1971), physician
 Christopher P. Chisholm (1854–?), Canadian lawyer and political figure
 Daniel Black Chisholm (1832–1899), Canadian farmer, lawyer and politician
 Donald Chisholm (1822–1890), Canadian Member of Parliament
 George King Chisholm (1814–1874), politician
 Joseph Andrew Chisholm (1863–1950), politician and jurist
 Kenneth Chisholm (1829–1906), Canadian businessman and politician
 Marie-Hélène Chisholm (born 1979), judoka
 Robert Chisholm (Canadian politician) (born 1957), former politician
 Robert Kerr Chisholm (1819–1899), politician
 William Chisholm (Nova Scotia politician) (1870–1936), politician
 William Chisholm (Upper Canada politician) (1788–1842), founder of Oakville, Ontario

In the United Kingdom
 Aeneas Chisholm (vicar apostolic of the Highland District) (1759–1818), Roman Catholic bishop in Scotland
 Aeneas Chisholm (Bishop of Aberdeen) (1836–1918), Scottish prelate who served as the Roman Catholic Bishop of Aberdeen
 Alex Chisholm (born 1968), British civil servant
 Alexander Chisholm (1792?–1847), British portrait and historical painter
 Alexander William Chisholm, 25th of Chisholm (1810–1838) Scottish landowner, clan chief and MP
 Caroline Chisholm (1808–1877), English humanitarian
 Catherine Chisholm (1878–1952), British physician
 Cecil Chisholm (1888–1961), British journalist, publisher and author
 David Chisholm (1937–1998), Scottish rugby union footballer
 Duncan Chisholm (born 1968), Scottish fiddle player and composer
 Erik Chisholm (1904–1965), Scottish composer and conductor
 Geoffrey Duncan Chisholm (1931–1994), British urologist
 George Chisholm (geographer) (1850–1930), author of first English-language economic geography textbook
 George Chisholm (musician) (1915–1997), jazz trombonist
 Gordon Chisholm (born 1960), Scottish footballer
 Grace Chisholm Young (1868–1944), mathematician (maiden name 'Chisholm')
 Hugh Chisholm (1866–1924), journalist and editor of the Encyclopædia Britannica
 Iain Chisholm (born 1985), Scottish footballer
 Janet Chisholm (1929–2004), MI6 agent
 John Chisholm (soldier), 16th-century Comptroller and Prefect of the Scottish artillery
 John Chisholm (vicar apostolic of the Highland District) (1752–1814), Roman Catholic bishop in Scotland
 John Chisholm (engineer) (born 1946), engineer, chairman of the Medical Research Council and QinetiQ
 John Stephen Roy Chisholm (1926–2015), English mathematical physicist
 Ken Chisholm (1925–1990), Scottish footballer
 Malcolm Chisholm (born 1949), Scottish politician
 Mairi Chisholm (1896–1981), Scottish nurse and ambulance driver in the First World War
 Melanie Chisholm (better known as Melanie C), British singer
 Robert Chisholm (architect) (1838–1915), architect of the Indo-Saracenic Senate House of the University of Madras
 William Chisholm (died 1564), bishop of Dunblane
 William Chisholm (died 1593), bishop of Dunblane and of Vaison, nephew to the above

In the United States
 Anthony Chisholm (actor), (1943–2020), American actor
 Henry Chisholm (1822–1881), Scottish American businessman
 Hugh J. Chisholm (1847–1912), industrialist
 Jesse Chisholm (died 1868), American Indian trader, guide, and interpreter for whom the Chisholm Trail is named
 John Chisholm (born 1963), American prosecutor
 Jori Chisholm (born 1975), bagpiper
 Kari Chisholm (born 1973), United States politician
 Linda Chisholm (born 1957), United States volleyball player
 Malcolm H. Chisholm (1945–2015), chemist
 Roderick Chisholm (1916–1999), philosopher
 Sallie W. Chisholm (born 1947), scientist who discovered the cyanobacterium Prochlorococcus
 Shirley Chisholm (1924–2005), politician
 Thomas Chisholm (songwriter), American songwriter who wrote several prominent Christian hymns including "Great Is Thy Faithfulness"
 Tim Chisholm (born 1969), player of real tennis
 Tanya Chisholm (born 1984), American actress
 William Chisholm (died 1877), victim of the Chisolm Massacre

Elsewhere
 Jamel Chisholm (born 1995), Jamaican international rugby league footballer playing in England
 Jazz Chisholm Jr. (born 1998), Bahamian baseball player

Chisholme 
 John James Scott-Chisholme (1851–1899), British cavalry officer who died in the Second Anglo-Boer War

Chisolm 
 Garrett Chisolm, American NFL player
 Richard Chisolm, cinematographer and film-maker based in Baltimore, Maryland

Chisum
 David Chisum (born 1970), American actor
 Donald S. Chisum, American legal scholar
 Gloria Chisum (born 1930), American psychologist
 John Chisum (1824–1884), American cattle baron, depicted in the 1970 Western film Chisum
 John Chisum (baseball) (1915–1982), American baseball player

See also
 Chisholm (disambiguation)
 Aeneas Chisholm (disambiguation)
 Alexander Chisholm (disambiguation)
 Anthony Chisholm (disambiguation)
 Colin Chisholm (disambiguation)
 George Chisholm (disambiguation)
 John Chisholm (disambiguation)
 Margaret Chisholm (disambiguation)

References

English-language surnames
Scottish surnames
Scottish Gaelic-language surnames